USS Kentucky (BB-66) was an uncompleted battleship intended to be the last ship of the . Hull BB-66 was originally to be the second ship of the s. As a result, hulls BB-65 and BB-66 were reordered and laid down as Iowa-class battleships in 1942.

As such, she was intended to be the sixth and final member of the Iowa-class constructed. At the time of her construction she was the second ship of the United States Navy to be named in honor of the U.S. state of Kentucky. Like her sister ship , laid down as one of the last pair of Iowa-class ahead of her, Kentucky was still under construction at the end of hostilities and became caught up in the post-war draw-down of the armed services. Her construction was suspended twice, during which times she served as a parts hulk. In the 1950s, several proposals were made to complete the ship as a guided missile battleship, abandoned primarily due to cost concerns and the rampant pace of evolving missile technology.  Kentucky ultimately was sold for scrap in 1958.

Background 

Kentucky was conceived in 1935, when the United States Navy initiated design studies for the creation of an extended  that was not restricted by the Second London Naval Treaty. This resulted in one of the "fast battleship" designs planned in 1938 by the Preliminary Design Branch at the Bureau of Construction and Repair.

The passage of the Second Vinson Act in 1938 had cleared the way for construction of the four South Dakota-class battleships and the first two Iowa-class fast battleships (those with the hull numbers BB-61 and BB-62). The latter four battleships of the class, those designated with the hull numbers BB-63, BB-64, BB-65, and BB-66 (Missouri, Wisconsin, Illinois, and Kentucky, respectively) were not cleared for construction until 12 July 1940. While BB-63 and BB-64 were originally planned as the final ships in the Iowa-class, BB-65 and BB-66 were intended to be the first ships of the Montana class which was larger and slower while mounting twelve  Mark 7 guns. The orders for BB-65 and BB-66 were placed on 9 September 1940, and the ships were laid down on 6 December 1942, and 7 March 1942, respectively.

By 1942 the United States Navy shifted its building focus from battleships to aircraft carriers after the successes of carrier combat in both the Battle of the Coral Sea, and to a greater extent, the Battle of Midway. As a result, the construction of the US fleet of s had been given the highest priority for completion in the US shipyards by the US Navy. The Essex-class carriers were proving vital to the war effort by enabling the Allies to gain and maintain air supremacy in the Pacific War, and were rapidly becoming the principal striking arm of the United States Navy in the ongoing effort to defeat the Empire of Japan. Accordingly, the United States accepted shortcomings in the armor of their s in favor of additional speed, which could steam at a comparable speed with the Essex-class and provide the carriers with the maximum amount of anti-aircraft protection.

Construction 
With the advent of air power and the mandate to gain and maintain air superiority came a need to protect the growing fleet of Allied aircraft carriers. To this end, Kentucky was to be fitted with an array of Oerlikon 20 mm and Bofors 40 mm anti-aircraft guns to defend allied carriers from enemy airstrikes.

Because the Iowa-class torpedo defense was virtually the same as the preceding South Dakota-class battleships it was proposed that Illinoiss and Kentuckys hull be redesigned to provide a greater degree of torpedo protection for the battleship. Under the original construction schematics for the class each side of the ship was protected below the waterline by two tanks mounted outside the belt armor, and separated by a bulkhead. These tanks were initially planned to be empty, but in practice were filled with water or fuel oil. Behind the armored belt there was a void, and then another bulkhead. The outer hull was intended to detonate a torpedo, with the outer two compartments absorbing the shock and with any splinters or debris being stopped by the armored belt and the empty compartment behind it. In 1939 the Navy discovered that this system was less effective than the earlier torpedo defense system of the North Carolina-class due to the excessive rigidity of the lower belt armor causing leakage into adjacent compartments. Subsequently, the design of the torpedo defense system was modified for Illinois and Kentucky, such as eliminating knuckles along certain holding bulkheads; the intended construction format was estimated to provide up to 20% improvement to the torpedo defense of the battleship while simultaneously reducing flooding in the event of a torpedo strike.

Kentuckys construction was plagued by suspensions. Her keel was laid down at the Norfolk Navy Yard, Portsmouth, Virginia, on 7 March 1942. However, work on the ship was suspended in June that year, and Kentuckys bottom structure was launched to make room for LST construction on 10 June. Work on the ship resumed on 6 December 1944, when the keel structure was moved to Dry Dock 8. Work on the battleship proceeded at a slow pace, and her completion was projected for the third quarter of 1946. In December 1945 it was recommended that Kentucky be completed as an anti-aircraft battleship, and work on the ship was suspended in August 1946 while this was considered. Construction resumed again on 17 August 1948 without any decision having been made on her final design. Work on Kentucky continued until 20 January 1950, when it was decided to halt work on the ship. Following this, she was floated out of her drydock to clear a space for repairs to sister ship , which had run aground en route from Hampton Roads.

Conversion proposals 

While her construction was suspended, the Bureau of Ships considered an aircraft carrier conversion proposal for Kentucky and Illinois in the aftermath of the Battles of Coral Sea and Midway. The idea was abandoned after the Bureau of Ships decided that the converted ships would carry fewer aircraft than the Essex class, that more Essex-class carriers could be built in the same amount of time, and that the conversion project would be significantly more expensive than new Essexes. Instead, Kentucky and Illinois were to be completed as battleships, but their construction was given very low priority.

As early as 1946, missile conversion projects for Kentucky (project SCB 19) and the incomplete large cruiser  were discussed. In the early 1950s, the advances in guided missile technology led to a proposal to create a large warship armed with both guns and missiles. To this end, the incomplete Kentucky was chosen for conversion from an all gun ship into a "guided missile battleship". This proposal would have been relatively conservative, and would have involved the installation of a pair of twin arm launchers for the RIM-2 Terrier surface-to-air missile (SAM) on the aft deckhouse, with a pair of antennas for the associated AN/APG-55 pulse doppler interception radar installed forward of these, and the AN/SPS-2B air search radar on a short mast. Since the battleship was already approximately 73% complete (construction had been halted at the second deck), installation of the missile system and associated electronics would have involved only adding the necessary equipment without any need to rebuild the ship to accommodate the system. Some guided missile concepts included one or two launchers for eight SSM-N-9 Regulus II or SSM-N-2 Triton nuclear cruise missiles. The guided missile battleship project was authorized in 1954, and Kentucky was renumbered from BB-66 to BBG-1, with the conversion due to be complete in 1956. However, the project was soon cancelled, with the conversion ideas transferred to a smaller platform that led to the  guided missile cruiser.  These partial conversions of two  heavy cruisers proved only partially successful in their new role, as the pace of change in cruise missile technology rendered their new weapons systems obsolete, while their remaining heavy guns proved in demand.

Another conversion project in early 1956 called for the installation of two Polaris nuclear ballistic missile launchers with a capacity for sixteen weapons. Also proposed were four RIM-8 Talos SAM launchers with eighty missiles per launcher and twelve RIM-24 Tartar SAM launchers with 504 missiles. A July 1956 estimate projected completing the ship by July 1961, but the cost of the conversion ultimately forced the Navy to abandon the project.

Fate 

Kentucky was never completed, instead serving as a parts hulk while in the mothball fleet at the Philadelphia Naval Shipyard from about 1950 to 1958. Hurricane Hazel hit the area on 15 October 1954, causing Kentucky to break free from her moorings and run aground in the Delaware River. Congressman William Huston Natcher attempted to block the sale of the ship by objecting to the bill in August 1957. Nevertheless, Kentucky was struck from the Naval Vessel Register on 9 June 1958 and her incomplete hulk was sold for scrapping to Boston Metals Company of Baltimore, Maryland on 31 October for $1,176,666. She was towed to their shipyard in Baltimore in February 1959.

When the Navy switched to 1,200 psi (8.3 MPa) boilers, sailors who had served aboard Sacramento and Camden provided the experience to operate the older lower-pressure boilers aboard  during her combat tour in the Vietnam War and aboard all four of the Iowas when they were recalled and modernized in the 1980s as part of the 600-ship Navy plan. A pair of  mahogany doors that had been donated by the state of Kentucky while the ship was under construction were removed and used in an officer's club in New York City before eventually being returned to the Kentucky Historical Society in early January 1994.

Notes

References

Footnotes

Bibliography 

Print sources

 
  
 
 
 
 
 
 

Online sources

Further reading

External links 

 Kentucky (BB-66), 1942–1958 
 Iowa class (BB-61 through BB-66), 1940 & 1941 Building Programs 
 

 

Iowa-class battleships
Cancelled ships of the United States Navy
Ships built in Portsmouth, Virginia
1944 ships